Route 229 is a state highway in the western Greater Hartford area of the U.S. state of Connecticut. It runs north–south from Interstate 84 in Southington to U.S. Route 6 in Bristol. Along the way, it intersects Route 72 in the Forestville section of Bristol.

Route description

Route 229 nominally begins at the end of the eastbound Exit 31 off-ramp of I-84 in western Southington, heading northward along West Street. West Street is four lanes wide in the vicinity of the I-84 interchange, then becomes a 3 lane (2 lanes northbound, 1 lane southbound) urban arterial as it heads north. Just south of the Bristol town line, Route 229 shifts to Middle Street and the road becomes four lanes wide.

Route 229 continues into Bristol, passing in front of the headquarters of ESPN and the access road to the Lake Compounce theme park. After crossing the Pequabuck River, it intersects Route 72.  After the intersection, the road becomes King Street, and narrows to 2 lanes.  It continues north for another  , passing in front of De Witt Page Park, until it reaches US 6 (Farmington Avenue) in the Edgewood section of the city.

History
Route 229 was originally just a series of town roads before the late 1950s. In anticipation of increased traffic as a result of the construction of I-84, Southington lobbied for state maintenance of a section of West Street. This was accepted into the state highway system on October 14, 1959. Several years later, Bristol also applied to have Middle Street and King Street turned over to the state in anticipation of through traffic between I-84 and downtown Bristol. The Highway Department accepted those streets into the state highway system on August 20, 1962. Route 229 was formally designated in 1963 as a result of the Route Reclassification Act.

In the 1970s, several plans for spot improvements on Route 229 were announced by the Department of Transportatation. The original plan was to reconstruct Route 229 from I-84 to the Bristol town line and widen it to four lanes. However, the plan had later changed to two lanes, with  shoulders.

Junction list

References

External links

229